Participation of the United States in regime change in Latin America involved US-backed coups d'état aimed at replacing left-wing leaders with right-wing leaders, military juntas, or authoritarian regimes. Lesser intervention of economic and military variety was prevalent during the Cold War in line with the Truman Doctrine of containment, but regime change involvement would increase after the drafting of NSC 68 which advocated for more aggressive combating of potential Soviet allies.

In the early-20th-century "Banana Republic" era of Latin American history, the U.S. launched several interventions and invasions in the region (known as the Banana Wars) to promote American business interests. United States influenced regime change in this period of Latin American history started after the signing of the Treaty of Paris in the wake of the Spanish-American War. Cuba gained its independence, while Puerto Rico and the Philippines were occupied by the United States. Expansive and imperialist U.S. foreign policy combined with new economic prospects led to increased U.S. intervention in Latin America from 1898 to the early 1930s. Continued activities lasted into the late 20th century.

History

Argentina

In Argentina, military forces overthrew the democratically elected President Isabel Perón in the 1976 Argentine coup d'état, starting the military dictatorship of General Jorge Rafael Videla, known as the National Reorganization Process. The coup was accepted and tacitly supported by the Ford administration and the U.S. government had close relations with the ensuing authoritarian regime, with U.S. Secretary of State Henry Kissinger paying several official visits to Argentina during the dictatorship.

Bolivia
The US government supported the 1971 coup led by General Hugo Banzer that toppled President Juan José Torres of Bolivia. Torres had displeased Washington by convening an "Asamblea del Pueblo" (Assembly of the People), in which representatives of specific proletarian sectors of society were represented (miners, unionized teachers, students, peasants), and more generally by leading the country in what was perceived as a left wing direction. Banzer hatched a bloody military uprising starting on August 18, 1971, that succeeded in taking the reins of power by August 22, 1971. After Banzer took power, the US provided extensive military and other aid to the Banzer dictatorship. Torres, who had fled Bolivia, was kidnapped and assassinated in 1976 as part of Operation Condor, the US-supported campaign of political repression and state terrorism by South American right-wing dictators.

Chile

After the democratic election of President Salvador Allende in 1970, an economic war ordered by President Richard Nixon, among other things, caused the 1973 Chilean coup d'état with the involvement of the CIA due to Allende's democratic socialist leanings. What followed was the decades-long US-backed military dictatorship of Augusto Pinochet. In 1988 a presidential referendum was held in order to confirm Pinochet's ruling for 8 more years. The oppositional Concertation of Parties for Democracy endorsed the "No" option, winning the referendum and ending Pinochet's rule democratically. After that free elections were held in 1989 with Concertation winning again.

A declassified report from the U.S. government "Annex-NSSM 97" details the plan developed in 1970 to overthrow President Allende were he to take office. The document explicitly states that the U.S. government's role should not be revealed and would primarily use Chilean institutions as a means of ousting the President. The Chilean military is highlighted as the best means to achieve this goal. The benefits of a coup initiated by the military are to reduce the threat of Marxism in Latin America and to disarm a potential threat to the United States.

Cuba

During the late 1800s, the U.S. sought to expand its economic interests by developing an economy overseas. This sentiment helped expand support for the Spanish-American War and Cuban liberation despite the U.S. previously establishing itself as anti-independence and revolution. America's victory in the war ended Spanish rule over Cuba, but promptly replaced it with American military occupation of the island from 1898–1902. 

After the end of the military occupation in 1902, the U.S. continued to exert significant influence over Cuba with policies like the Platt Amendment. In subsequent years American forces regularly invaded and intervened in Cuba, with the U.S. military occupying Cuba again from 1906–1909, and U.S. marines being sent to Cuba from 1917–1922 to protect American-owned sugar plantations. The United States also supported Cuban dictator Fulgencio Batista as his policies benefited American business interests.

After the Cuban Revolution and Fidel Castro's rise to power, American relations with Cuba became increasingly hostile. American forces trained, supplied, and supported the Cuban exiles who attempted to overthrow Castro in the Bay of Pigs Invasion of 1961, but the invasion was defeated and Castro retained control. In subsequent decades, American intelligence operatives made numerous attempts to assassinate Castro, but these ultimately failed as well.

Dominican Republic 

In May 1961, the ruler of the Dominican Republic, right-wing dictator Rafael Trujillo, was murdered with weapons supplied by the United States Central Intelligence Agency (CIA). An internal CIA memorandum states that a 1973 Office of Inspector General investigation into the murder disclosed "quite extensive Agency involvement with the plotters". The CIA described its role in "changing" the government of the Dominican Republic as a 'success' in that it assisted in moving the Dominican Republic from a totalitarian dictatorship to a Western-style democracy. Socialist Juan Bosch, whose propaganda and institute for political training had received some CIA funding via the J. M. Kaplan Fund, was elected president of the Dominican Republic in its first free elections, in December 1962. Bosch was deposed by a right-wing coup in September 1963. American President Lyndon Johnson intervened into the 1965 Dominican Civil War by sending American troops to help end the war and prevent supporters of the deposed Bosch from taking over. On July 1, 1966, elections were held with Joaquín Balaguer winning against Bosch.

Guatemala
Peasants and workers (mostly of indigenous descent) revolt during the first half of the 20th century due to harsh living conditions and the abuse from landlords and the government-supported American United Fruit Company. This revolt was repressed, but led to the democratic election of Jacobo Arbenz. Arbenz was overthrown during the 1954 Guatemalan coup d'état, endorsed by the United States.

Nicaragua

In 1912, during the Banana Wars period, the U.S. occupied Nicaragua as a means of protecting American business interests and protecting the rights that Nicaragua granted to the United States to construct a canal there. The intervention, utilizing the U.S. Marine Corps, was sparked by a rebellion that opposed the United States. After quelling the rebellion, the U.S. continued occupying Nicaragua until 1933, when President Herbert Hoover officially ended the occupation.

Panama

Increasing tensions between Manuel Noriega's dictatorship and the US government led to the United States invasion of Panama in 1989, which ended in Noriega's overthrow.

See also 
 American imperialism
 Foreign interventions by the United States
 Foreign relations of the United States
 Latin America–United States relations
 List of free-trade agreements
 List of United States military bases
 United States involvement in regime change
 United States and state terrorism

References

History of South America
Latin American history
United States–South American relations
United States–Central American relations
United States–Caribbean relations